Shi Jin is a fictional character in Water Margin, one of the Four Great Classical Novels in Chinese literature. Nicknamed "Nine-Tattoo Dragon", he ranks 23rd among the 36 Heavenly Spirits, the first third of the 108 Stars of Destiny.

Background
The only child of Squire Shi, headman of the Shi Family Village in Huayin County (in present-day Shaanxi province), Shi Jin is very passionate about martial arts since childhood that his father keeps looking for better instructors to train him. To look awesome, he even has nine dragons tattooed on his body, which earn him the nickname "Nine-Tattoo Dragon".

Meeting Wang Jin
Shi Jin is the first of the 108 Stars of Destiny to appear in the novel. He is practising with a staff in his house's courtyard when Wang Jin, an instructor of the imperial guards in the imperial capital Dongjing, walks in. Wang is temporarily putting up in the Shi household with his mother. They are fleeing to Weizhou and have by chance come to the Shi manor, where they are offered free lodgings for a night by the kindly Squire Shi. But the mother fell ill and the stay has to be extended. Wang has secretly left Dongjing in fear of revenge from his new boss Grand Marshal Gao Qiu. Gao was once beaten by Wang's father in a row at a time when Gao was still a commoner.

Finding Shi Jin's fighting skill wanting, Wang makes a frank comment which the young man overhears. Stung and ignoring his father's objection, Shi Jin challenges Wang to a fight. He is easily beaten by Wang. Humbled, Shi Jin apologises to the instructor and asks him to be his teacher.

Wang Jin coaches Shi Jin for some time before continuing his journey to Weizhou. Shi Jin becomes headman of Shi Family Village after his father died.

Becoming an outlaw

Chen Da, one of the three bandit chiefs on Mount Shaohua (少華山; southeast of present-day Hua County, Shaanxi), comes by Shi Family Village with his men on the way to plunder the well-stocked Huayin County for food. Shi Jin blocks his path and captures him in a one-on-one fight on horseback. When told the news, the other two chiefs, Zhu Wu and Yang Chun, come to the village to beg Shi Jin to arrest them as well so that they can fulfill their oath to die together. Moved by their bond, Shi Jin frees Chen and becomes a friend of the three. Henceforth, the two sides often exchange gifts and hold feast for each other.

One day, a servant of Shi Jin, when returning from an errand to invite the bandit chiefs to a feast at his master's house,  loses the reply letter of the outlaws after getting drunk and falling asleep in a grove. The letter is taken away by a hunter who submits it to the authorities. Soldiers are sent to Shi Jin's house to arrest the bunch on the night of the feast.

Finding his manor surrounded, Shi Jin burns it down and fights his way out with the bandit chiefs. They make it to Mount Shaohua, where Shi Jin declines Zhu Wu's plea that he be their chief. He leaves for Weizhou to look for Wang Jin.

In Weizhou (渭州; around present-day Pingliang, Gansu), Shi Jin could not find his teacher but meets and befriends Lu Da, a local garrison officer. Later, as he wonders aimlessly and resorts to robbery to obtain money, he runs into Lu Da again, who by then has become a monk with the Buddhist name Lu Zhishen to conceal his identity as he had killed a bully. The two together defeat and kill a monk and a priest who enslaves the monks of a temple and holds a woman in captivity.

Joining Liangshan
Shi Jin returns to Mount Shaohua and is made its chief. One day he learns that Prefect He, the governor of Hua prefecture, or Huazhou, has abducted the daughter of a painter to force her to be his concubine . Shi sneaks into the prefect's house to save the woman but is captured. 

The news riles Lu Zhishen, who has come to invite Shi Jin to join Liangshan. He rushes to Huazhou alone to rescue Shi. But He spots him behaving strangely in a crowd as he contemplates assassination seeing the official appearing in public with his guards. Prefect He lures Lu to come with him to his office where the monk too is seized. Mount Shaohua turns to Liangshan for help, which promptly sends a force led by Song Jiang. Posing as imperial officials sent by the Song court to pray at the hallowed Mount Hua, the Liangshan team commands Prefect He to come out of the city to meet them. As soon as He turns up, the outlaws kill him. They then enter the city to free Shi Jin and Lu Zhishen. The bandits of Mount Shaohua, led by Shi Jin, is absorbed into Liangshan.

When Liangshan attack Dongping prefecture for food, Shi Jin volunteers to infiltrate the city to launch an internal sabotage. He takes cover in the house of a prostitute whom he once patronised. But the brothel owner squeals on him, leading to his arrest. He is freed after the outlaws overran Dongping.

Campaigns and death
Shi Jin is appointed as one of the Eight Tiger Cub Vanguard Generals of the Liangshan cavalry after all the 108 Stars of Destiny came together in what is called the Grand Assembly, He participates in the campaigns against the Liao invaders and rebels in Song territory following amnesty from Emperor Huizong for Liangshan.

In the battle of Runzhou (潤州; present-day Runzhou District, Zhenjiang, Jiangsu) in the campaign against Fang La, Shi Jin slays an enemy officer Shen Gang. Later, he and five other Liangshan heroes are sent to attack Yuling Pass (昱嶺關; near present-day Zhupu Village, She County, Anhui), which is guarded by Pang Wanchun. Shi Jin meets his end when Pang hits him with an arrow.  The other five are fatally shot by Pang's archers.

See also
 List of Water Margin minor characters#Shi Jin's story for a list of supporting minor characters from Shi Jin's story.

References
 
 
 
 
 
 
 

36 Heavenly Spirits
Fictional characters from Shaanxi